Nextstrain is a collaboration between researchers in Seattle, United States and Basel, Switzerland which provides a collection of open-source tools for visualising the  genetics behind the spread of viral outbreaks.

Its aim is to support public health measures and surveillance by facilitating understanding of the spread and evolution of pathogens. The Nextstrain platform was begun in 2015. Code developed by Nextstrain is made publicly available, via, for example github.com and its data is available and viewable in accessible form via the pages at the website.

Applications

According to their website, the Nextstrain team maintains an up-to-date genomic analysis of each of the following pathogens:
 Avian influenza
 Dengue
 Enterovirus D68
 Measles
 Mumps
 SARS-CoV-2
 Seasonal influenza
 Tuberculosis
 West Nile virus
 West African Ebola 2013-16
 Zika
 Monkeypox virus

Covid-19 pandemic
Nextstrain and its results have been widely quoted during the COVID-19 pandemic.

Award
In May 2020, Nextstrain and Trevor Bedford (Associate professor, Fred Hutchinson Cancer Research Center) received a Webby Special Achievement Award for the web tool.

See also 
 GISAID
 PANGOLIN
 List of COVID-19 simulation models

References

External links 
 

International medical and health organizations
Genome databases